Hsipaw (Tai Nuea: ᥔᥤᥴ ᥙᥨᥝᥳ), also known as Thibaw, is the principal town of Hsipaw Township in Shan State, Myanmar on the banks of the Duthawadi River.

History
The capital of Hsipaw was originally On Baung. From the 1450s, it was a faithful vasal of the Kingdom of Ava (1364-1527). After the fall of the latter before the Shans, a prince of On Baung, Sao Hkhun Mong, was crowned  King of Ava (1543-1546). A few decades later, King Bayinnaung, who reigned in Hanthawaddy Kingdom, sent an army against On Baung, whose prince, like the other Shan princes, had to recognize his sovereignty to keep his throne (1557). The shans also had to cede part of their states, including Mogok, but the prince of On Baung obtained confirmation of his pre-eminence over the other shans princes.

The dynasty of On Baung was maintained, paying tribute to the successive Burmese dynasties: Toungoo dynasty (1535-1752) then Konbaung dynasty (1752-1885). In 1714, its capital was transferred to Hsipaw. Sao Kya Tung was his Saopha for the King of Burma Mindon Min, as a reward for his help against Pagan Min.

In February 2021, the Tatmadaw attacked the Restoration Council of Shan State’s camps in Hsipaw Township, breaking the Nationwide Ceasefire Agreement (NCA) according to the RCSS.

Shan Saopha

Hsipaw State was perhaps one of the most well known and powerful saopha Shan States. According to the biography of Sao Nang Hearn Hkam (the chief wife, Madhidevi of Sao Shwe Thaik, the first president of Myanmar and another saopha of Hsenwi), Hsipaw, along with Kengtung and Yawnghwe were the wealthiest and most powerful saopha states in Shan State.

The Saophas played fluctuating roles in regional Shan and national Burmese politics from the 11th century all the way until the 1962 military coup by General Ne Win.

Princes of Hsipaw  

 58 BC Sao Hkun Hkam Saw 1st 
 Sao Hkun Hkam Naw 2nd 
 Sao Hkun Hkam Hko 3rd
 165–201 Sao Hkun Hkam Pan 8th   
 201–250 Paw Aik Phyao 9th 
 250–252 Awk Ai Lung 10th 
 Paw Pan (Sao Hpa Lung Hkam Pan) 11th
 Hso Pan Hpa 12th (son of Hso Hom Hpa, the saopha of Möng Mao
 957 Hkun Tai Hkam 
 1058 Hso Oom Hpa 38th 
 1395–1410 Nwe San Hpa 
 1410–1424 Sao Hkem Hpa  
 1424–1439 Hso Kawng Hpa 52nd 
 1439–1460 Sao Hsan Hpa 
 1460–1473 Hkam Yat Hpa 
 1473–1488 Sao Yak Hpa 
 1488–1500 Hso Bok Hpa 
 1500–1541 Sao Tammara  
 1541–1542 Sao Hkun Naing (son of Sao Tammara) 
 1542–1552 Hso Hom Hpa (son of Sao Hkun Naing) 
 1552–1557 Hso Yeam Hpa (son of Hso Hom Hpa) 
 1557–1564 Hso Klang Hpa (son of Hso Hom Hpa) 
 1564–1577 Hso Saw Hpa 62th (son of Hso Hom Hpa) 
 1577–1593 Hso Kaw Hpa 63th (son of Sao Hkun Naing ex-saopha of Mongpai and ex-King Mobye Narapati of Ava) 
 1593–1626 Tap Hseng Hkam 
 1626–1650 Hkun Hkam Hlaing 65th (son of Tap Hseng Hkam) 
 1650–1675 Hsen Tai San Wei  
 1675–1702 Hso Waing Hpa 
 1702–1714 Sao Okka Wara
 1714–1718 Sao Okka Seya
 1718–1722 Sao Sam Myo
 1722–1752 Sao Hkun Neng
 1752–1767 Sawra Tawta 
 1767–1788 Sao Myat San Te
 1788–1809 Sao Hswe Kya
 1809–1843 Sao Hkun Hkwi
 1843–1853 Sao Hkun Paw
 1853–1858 Sao Kya Htun (d. 1866)
 1858–1866 Hkun Myat Than 
 1866–1886 Sao Kya Hkeng	(deposed 1882-86) (d. 1902) 
 Mar 1886–8 May 1902 Sao Hkun Hseng
 8 May 1902–May 1928 Sao Hkun Hke (b. 1872 - d. 1928) (from 2 Jan 1928, Sir Sao Hke)
 1928–Jul 1938	I Sao Ohn Kya (b. 1893 - d. 1938)
 1938–1947 administered by British India
 1947–1959 Sao Kya Hseng (b. 1924 - d. 1962)

Pretender 
 Sao Kya Hseng (1959–1962)
Sao Oo Kya (1962-)

Climate

References

External links

Viaja por libre. Hiking in Hsipaw (Spanish)

Gallery

Populated places in Shan State
Township capitals of Myanmar